Be'erot Yitzhak (lit. Yitzhak Wells) is a religious kibbutz in central Israel. Located near Yehud, it falls under the jurisdiction of Hevel Modi'in Regional Council.

History
During the 18th and 19th centuries, the area belonged to the Nahiyeh (sub-district) of Lod that encompassed the area of the present-day city of Modi'in-Maccabim-Re'ut in the south to the present-day city of El'ad in the north, and from the foothills in the east, through the Lod Valley to the outskirts of Jaffa in the west. This area was home to thousands of inhabitants in about 20 villages, who had at their disposal tens of thousands of hectares of prime agricultural land.

The kibbutz was originally established near Gaza (at the present location of Alumim) in 1943 by a group of Jewish refugees (olim) from Occupied Czechoslovakia and Nazi Germany who were members of Religious Pioneers Alliance (Brit Halutzim Dati'im), and was named after Rabbi Yitzhak Nisanboim. The name also recalls the patriarch Isaac's search for water in this area.

In 1947, the village had a population of 150. During the 1948 Arab–Israeli War the kibbutz took serious losses and was badly damaged by the Egyptian Army in the Battle of Be'erot Yitzhak, which included aerial bombardment. According to a report by the Jewish National Fund, the Egyptians were driven out of the grounds and suffered "hundreds" of losses. It was abandoned and its homes destroyed. In 1949 there was a trial of re-establishing the kibbutz on the remains of Wilhema. In 1952 the residents moved to the current site.

References

External links
Official website

Czech-Jewish culture in Israel
German-Jewish culture in Israel
Slovak-Jewish culture in Israel
Kibbutzim
Religious Kibbutz Movement
Populated places established in 1943
Populated places established in 1952
Jewish villages in Mandatory Palestine
Jewish villages depopulated during the 1948 Arab–Israeli War
Populated places in Central District (Israel)
1943 establishments in Mandatory Palestine
1952 establishments in Israel